Attonitus is a genus of characin endemic to Peru.

Species
There are currently 3 recognized species in this genus:
 Attonitus bounites Vari & H. Ortega, 2000
 Attonitus ephimeros Vari & H. Ortega, 2000
 Attonitus irisae Vari & H. Ortega, 2000

References

Characidae
Fish of Peru